Synolabus bipustulatus, known generally as the oak leafrolling weevil or red spotted leaf-roller, is a species of leaf-rolling weevil in the family of beetles known as Attelabidae.

References

Further reading

External links

 

Attelabidae
Beetles described in 1776
Taxa named by Johan Christian Fabricius